Graham Claude Windeatt (born 5 August 1954) is an Australian former long-distance freestyle swimmer of the 1970s, who won a silver medal in the 1500-metre freestyle at the 1972 Summer Olympics in Munich.
 
In 1971 as a school student Windeatt broke the men's world 800-metre freestyle record in the NSW Combined High Schools Swimming Championships held at North Sydney pool.

Windeatt made his debut at the 1970 Commonwealth Games in Edinburgh, where he claimed gold in the 1500-metre freestyle.  In Munich, he was involved in an epic battle with the reigning 1500-metre Olympic champion from 1968, the United States' Mike Burton.  After leading for 600 metres, Burton was passed by Windeatt, before reclaiming the lead in the last 300 metres. Later in the Olympics, Windeatt came fourth in the 400-metre freestyle.  Windeatt also placed seventh in the 400-metre individual medley and fifth in the 4×200-metre freestyle relay.

Following the Munich Olympic Games, he took up a swimming scholarship to the University of Tennessee.  During his time at the university he became an All-American and with the team won conference championships and placings in National Collegiate championships.

Windeatt was also selected for the 1975 World Championship just missing a medal in the 400-metre freestyle and competing in the 200-metre freestyle final. The year following he was Australian Swim Team Captain for the 1976 Montreal Olympics.

He married Nira Stove in 1979, they have two adult children.

See also
 List of Commonwealth Games medallists in swimming (men)
 List of Olympic medalists in swimming (men)
 World record progression 800 metres freestyle

References 

1954 births
Living people
Australian male freestyle swimmers
Australian male medley swimmers
Olympic silver medalists for Australia
Olympic swimmers of Australia
Swimmers at the 1972 Summer Olympics
Swimmers at the 1976 Summer Olympics
World record setters in swimming
Australian long-distance swimmers
Tennessee Volunteers men's swimmers
Medalists at the 1972 Summer Olympics
Olympic silver medalists in swimming
Commonwealth Games medallists in swimming
Commonwealth Games gold medallists for Australia
Swimmers at the 1970 British Commonwealth Games
20th-century Australian people
Medallists at the 1970 British Commonwealth Games